Intergovernmental immunity is a legal doctrine in federations that defines the extent to which laws of a federal government and its subnational units can bind one another.

Intergovernmental immunity (Australia)
Intergovernmental immunity (United States)

See also
Interjurisdictional immunity (Canada)